Koderu or Kodair is a village and mandal headquarters in Nagar Kurnool district, Telangana, India.

Geography
Kodair is at coordinates 16.2667°N 78.3000°E on world map. It has an average elevation of 371 metres (1220 ft) from sea level. 

Kodair is a village and mandal head quarter in Nagar Kurnoor district (it was Mahbub Nagar, before district reorganization) of Telangana state, previously united Andhra Pradesh State, India.  It is  km south of district headquarters Mahabubnagar, and 147 km south of the state capital, Hyderabad. 

Kodair Mandal is bounded by Peddakothapally Mandal to the east, Pangal Mandal to the west, Kollapur Mandal to the south, Gopalpet Mandal to the west. Nagarkurnool City, Wanaparthy City, Gadwal City, Badepalle City are the nearby cities to Kodair.

Kodair consist of 35 villages and 15 Panchayats  Khanapur is the smallest village, and Kodair is the largest village of all.  

Srisailam, Mantralayam, Nagarjunasagar, Hyderabad, Kurnool are the nearby important tourist destinations to see.

Demographics of Kodair Mandal

Telugu is the local language here. Also people speak Hindi, Urdu. Total population of Kodair Mandal is 32,540, living in 6,942 houses, spread across total 35 villages and 15 panchayats. Males are 16,381 and females are 16,159.
 
Weather and climate of Kodair Mandal

It is too hot in summer. Kodair summer highest day temperature is in between 32 °C to 43 °C. 
Average temperatures of January is 27 °C, February is 27 °C, March is 31 °C, April is 34 °C, May is 35 °C.

Institutions
 Zilla Parishad High School
 Boys Primary School
 Girls Primary School
 Kasturba Gandhi Balika Gurukula Vidyalayam
 Model High School (under construction, expected to open 2013)
 Kodair Gram Panchayat
 Mandal Revenue Office
 Mandal Development Office
 Primary Health Center
 Police Station
 Kodair Mandal Praja Parishad Karyalayam
 Sangameshwara Grameena Bank
 Veterinary dispensary (VD)

Villages
The villages in Kodair mandal include:
 Bavaipally 	
 Janumpally 	
 Kadirepad 	
 Kodair 	
 Kondraopally 	
 Machupally 	
 Muthireddypally 	
 Mylaram
 Nagulapally &(Tanda)	
 Narsaipally 	
 Pasupula 	
 Rajapur 	
 Turkadinne
 Singaipally 	
 Teegalapally
 Yetham

References

Mandals in Mahbubnagar district